Iglesia de San Nicolás may refer to:

 Iglesia de San Nicolás (Avilés), a church in Asturias, Spain
 Iglesia de San Nicolás (Guadalajara)
 Iglesia de San Nicolás (Madrid)
 Iglesia de San Nicolás (Villoria), a church in Asturias, Spain